Euchalcia modestoides is a moth of the family Noctuidae. It is found from the temperate areas of central Europe, east to Japan.

Adults are on wing from June to July.

The larvae feed on Pulmonaria species and Cynoglossum officinale.

External links

Fauna Europaea
Funet
Lepiforum.de
schmetterlinge-deutschlands.de

Plusiinae
Moths of Europe